Rodolfo Ziberna (born 11 November 1961 in Gorizia) is an Italian politician.

He is a member of the centre-right party Forza Italia. He was elected Mayor of Gorizia on 25 June 2017 and took office the following day.

See also
2017 Italian local elections
List of mayors of Gorizia

References

External links

1961 births
Living people
Mayors of places in Friuli-Venezia Giulia
People from Gorizia
Forza Italia politicians
Forza Italia (2013) politicians
Italian Democratic Socialist Party politicians
The People of Freedom politicians
University of Bologna alumni